Rindos is a surname. Notable people with the surname include:

David Rindos (1947–1996), American archaeologist and anthropologist
Lukáš Rindoš (born 1987), Czech ice hockey player

See also
Rindos affair, an academic scandal
Rindos v Hardwick, an Australian defamation case